Daniel Black (16 April 1911 – May 1978) was an English professional footballer who played in the Football League for Carlisle United and Mansfield Town.

References

1911 births
1978 deaths
English footballers
Association football goalkeepers
English Football League players
Carlisle United F.C. players
Rotherham United F.C. players
Mansfield Town F.C. players
Peterborough United F.C. players